Kamuti is a surname. Notable people with the surname include:

Jenő Kamuti (born 1937), Hungarian foil fencer
László Kamuti (1940–2020), Hungarian fencer

Hungarian-language surnames